Shingo Kunieda and Gordon Reid defeated Gustavo Fernández and Nicolas Peifer in the final, 6–1, 7–6(7–1) to win the men's doubles wheelchair tennis title at the 2015 French Open. With the win, Kunieda completed a non-calendar-year Grand Slam.

Joachim Gérard and Stéphane Houdet were the defending champions, but were defeated by Fernández and Peifer in the semifinals.

Seeds

Draw

Finals

References
 Draw

Wheelchair Men's Doubles
French Open, 2015 Men's Doubles